Vasiliy Gavrilovich Grabin (– 18 April 1980) was a Soviet artillery designer. He led a design bureau (TsAKB) at Joseph Stalin Factory No. 92 in Gorky (Nizhny Novgorod).

Grabin was chief designer of ZiS-3, the  divisional field gun, which was the most numerous cannon of World War II (over 103,000 cannons were built).

Grabin was the first artillery designer to use ergonomics in cannon construction (before the word ergonomics even appeared). In the 1930s he used physiologist consultations to optimize the design of cannons.

Further reading 
Широкорад А.Б., Гений советской артиллерии: Триумф и трагедия В. Грабина, ООО «Издательство АСТ», 2003, 429 pp., .

1900 births
1980 deaths
20th-century Russian engineers
People from Krasnoarmeysky District, Krasnodar Krai
People from Kuban Oblast
Academic staff of Bauman Moscow State Technical University
Communist Party of the Soviet Union members
Second convocation members of the Supreme Soviet of the Soviet Union
Third convocation members of the Supreme Soviet of the Soviet Union
Heroes of Socialist Labour
Stalin Prize winners
Recipients of the Order of Lenin
Recipients of the Order of the Red Banner
Recipients of the Order of the Red Banner of Labour
Recipients of the Order of the Red Star
Recipients of the Order of Suvorov, 1st class
Recipients of the Order of Suvorov, 2nd class
Russian engineers
Russian inventors
Soviet colonel generals
Soviet engineers

Soviet inventors
Weapon designers
Burials at Novodevichy Cemetery